This is an index of lists of deities of the different religions, cultures and mythologies of the world.

 List of deities by classification
 Lists of deities by cultural sphere
 List of goddesses
 List of fictional deities
 List of people who have been considered deities; see also Apotheosis, Imperial cult and Sacred king
 Names of God (epithets of gods of monotheistic religions)
 List of Roman deities